Sally Field is an American actress known for her roles on stage and screen. 

She has received various accolades, including two Academy Award for Best Actress for Norma Rae (1979), and Places in the Heart (1984). She also received three Emmy Awards, two Golden Globe Awards, a Screen Actors Guild Award, a Cannes Film Festival Award, and nominations for a Tony Award and for two British Academy Film Awards. 

She's been presented with numerous honors over her career including a star on the Hollywood Walk of Fame in 2014, Kennedy Center Honor in 2019, and a Screen Actors Guild Life Achievement Award in 2023.

Major associations

Academy Awards

BAFTA Awards

Primetime Emmy Awards

Golden Globe Awards

Screen Actors Guild Awards

Tony Awards

Miscellaneous awards

References

External links
 

Field, Sally